Bonshaw is a rural locality in the Goondiwindi Region, Queensland, Australia. It is on the border of Queensland and New South Wales.

History 
The locality takes its name from an early pastoral run.

Land in Bonshaw was open for selection on 17 April 1877;  were available.

References 

Goondiwindi Region
Localities in Queensland